The Irving Baptist Church is a historic Baptist church in Ryan, Oklahoma. It was built in 1928 and added to the National Register of Historic Places in 2009. The building has some elements of Gothic Revival architecture.

The first wedding in the church was on April 1, 1934, the marriage of Una Ellie Smith (1912-2014) and Russell Harris.

According to a business directory, the current church entity was created in 2005 and has five employees.

References

Baptist churches in Oklahoma
Churches on the National Register of Historic Places in Oklahoma
Gothic Revival church buildings in Oklahoma
Churches completed in 1928
Buildings and structures in Jefferson County, Oklahoma
National Register of Historic Places in Jefferson County, Oklahoma